The Dassault Falcon is a family of business jets, manufactured by Dassault Aviation.
July 2017 saw the 2,500th Falcon delivered – a Falcon 900LX – since the first Falcon 20 was handed over to a customer in 1965. The fleet has accumulated 17.8 million hours of flight time with approximately 1,230 operators in 90 countries and as of July 2017 more than 2,100 Falcons are in service. In 2018, Dassault launched the new Falcon 6X with a  range for a 2022 introduction.
Dassault offers the midsize Falcon 2000S/LXS twinjet, the long-range Falcon 900LX trijet and ultra-long range Falcon 7X/8X trijets.

Aircraft

Timeline

Falcon X

Dassault intends to launch a new Falcon model at the end of 2017, focusing on enhanced comfort and reducing fuel consumption and noise.
JetNet iQ assumes this Falcon 9X would incorporate the Falcon 5X cross-section for comfort and lower takeoff weights thus lower-thrust engines than competition for lower noise, and favors a twin engine configuration for easier maintenance and to avoid redesigning the 5X.

To lower fuel burn, it may extend the wing laminar flow portion as Dassault participates in the EU Clean Sky initiative with the Breakthrough laminar aircraft which should start flight testing in summer 2017.
Wind tunnel testing of a U-shaped empennage could “mask” aircraft noise from the engines on the ground.
Dassault will receive in late 2017 a machine tool for the development of new composite materials which should reduce aircraft maintenance needs and improve recycling.
Within the Hycarus research project, a fuel cell will be flight tested by 2017 end to reduce the bleed air or accessory drive usage or eventually replace the auxiliary power unit.

References

External links
Official website